Enallopsammia is a genus of cnidarians belonging to the family Dendrophylliidae.

The genus has cosmopolitan distribution.

Species:

Enallopsammia profunda 
Enallopsammia pusilla 
Enallopsammia reflexa 
Enallopsammia rostrata

References

Dendrophylliidae
Scleractinia genera